The New York Policy Forum is a not-for-profit organization based in New York City. Founded by Jonathan Cohen and John Giardino the New York Policy Forum hosts a series of "expert panels and speakers on a wide range of issues spanning public policy, human rights, education, and the arts."

Panels Hosted by the New York Policy Forum

The Future of New York’s Upstate Cities: Buffalo, Rochester and Syracuse - June 9, 2011

Panelists
Bruce Fisher, founding Director of the Center for Economic and Policy Studies at Buffalo State College and a former Deputy County Executive of Erie County.
E.J. McMahon, Senior Fellow at the Empire Center and the Manhattan Institute's Senior Fellow for Tax and Budgetary Studies.
The Honorable Stephanie Miner, Mayor of Syracuse, New York
Moderator: Mitchell Moss, Director of the Rudin Center for Transportation Policy and Management and Henry Rice Professor of Urban Policy and Planning at New York University's Wagner Graduate School of Public Service.

Hydrofracking in New York’s Marcellus Shale: Poison or Panacea? - October 6, 2011

Panelists
Dr. Terry Engelder, Professor of Geosciences, Penn State University and one of Foreign Policy Magazine's Top 100 Global Thinkers for 2011.
Albert F. Appleton, former Commissioner, New York City Department of Environmental Protection and partner with Citizens for Water
Stuart Gruskin, former Deputy Commissioner, New York State Department of Environmental Conservation
Matthew T. Ryan, Mayor of the City of Binghamton, New York
Moderator: Jamie Kitman, Automobile Magazine

Jazz and Democracy in America - December 8, 2011

Panelists
T.S. Monk, Legendary Jazz Artist
Helen Sung, Award-Winning Jazz Pianist
Sheila Anderson, Jazz Host, WBGO
Dr. Wesley Watkins IV, Director, The Jazz & Democracy Project
Moderator: John Giardino, New York Policy Forum

Notes

External links
 Official site
 Facebook page
 Jonathan Cohen and John Giardino, "The Empire State Can Rise Again", The Wall Street Journal, July 23, 2011
 Jamie Kitman, "Hydrofracking in New York? Too dangerous, and too costly to properly regulateNew York Daily News, November 6, 2011
 T.S. Monk's Official Website
 The Jazz & Democracy Project website

Organizations established in 2011
Non-profit organizations based in New York City
2011 establishments in New York City